Tiago da Silva Dutra (born 17 September 1990 in Gravataí, Rio Grande do Sul) is a Brazilian footballer who plays for América de Natal as a midfielder.

External links
 Villarreal official profile
 
 Futbolme profile  
 

1990 births
Living people
Sportspeople from Rio Grande do Sul
Brazilian footballers
Brazil youth international footballers
Association football midfielders
Campeonato Brasileiro Série A players
Israeli Premier League players
Grêmio Foot-Ball Porto Alegrense players
Criciúma Esporte Clube players
Segunda División players
Villarreal CF B players
Maccabi Haifa F.C. players
Brazilian expatriate footballers
Expatriate footballers in Spain
Expatriate footballers in Israel